Hong Kong 97 may refer to:
 Handover of Hong Kong in 1997
 Hong Kong '97, a 1994 American action thriller film
 Hong Kong 97 (video game), a 1995 video game made for the Super Famicom
 HK97, a bacterial virus